The John Agro Special Teams Award is presented to the CFL's Most Outstanding Special Teams player that is voted by his peers. The award is named in honour of John Agro, co-founder (in 1965) of the Canadian Football League Players' Association, with whom he also served as legal counsel.

John Agro Special Teams Award winners
2022 - Mario Alford (KR/PR), Saskatchewan Roughriders
2021 - DeVonte Dedmon (KR/PR), Ottawa Redblacks
2020 – season cancelled - COVID-19
2019 - Frankie Williams (KR/PR), Hamilton Tiger-Cats
2018 - Lewis Ward (K), Ottawa Redblacks
2017 - Roy Finch (KR), Calgary Stampeders
2016 - Justin Medlock (K), Winnipeg Blue Bombers
2015 - Brandon Banks (WR) Hamilton Tiger-Cats
2014 - Swayze Waters (K), Toronto Argonauts
2013 - Rene Paredes (K), Calgary Stampeders
2012 - Chris Williams (WR), Hamilton Tiger-Cats
2011 - Paul McCallum (K), BC Lions
2010 - Chad Owens (WR), Toronto Argonauts
2009 - Larry Taylor (WR), Montreal Alouettes
2008 - Dominique Dorsey (RB), Toronto Argonauts
2007 - Ian Smart (RB), BC Lions
2006 - Sandro DeAngelis (K), Calgary Stampeders
2005 - Corey Holmes (RB), Saskatchewan Roughriders
2004 - Keith Stokes (WR), Winnipeg Blue Bombers
2003 - Bashir Levingston (WR), Toronto Argonauts
2002 - Corey Holmes (RB), Saskatchewan Roughriders
2001 - Charles Roberts (RB), Winnipeg Blue Bombers
2000 - Albert Johnson III (WR), Winnipeg Blue Bombers
1999 - Jimmy Cunningham (RB), BC Lions

John Agro Special Teams Award runners-up
2022 - Chandler Worthy (KR), Montreal Alouettes
2021 - Rene Paredes (K), Calgary Stampeders
2020 – season cancelled - covid 19
2019 - Mike Miller (FB/ST), Winnipeg Blue Bombers
2018 - Ty Long (P/K), BC Lions
2017 - Diontae Spencer (KR), Ottawa RedBlacks
2016 - Brandon Banks (WR) Hamilton Tiger-Cats
2015 - Rene Paredes (K), Calgary Stampeders
2014 - Lirim Hajrullahu (K), Winnipeg Blue Bombers
2013 - Marc Beswick (CB), Hamilton Tiger-Cats
2012 - Tim Brown (RB), BC Lions
2011 - Chad Owens (WR), Toronto Argonauts
2010 - Yonus Davis (RB), BC Lions
2009 - Jason Arakgi (LB), BC Lions
2008 - Sandro DeAngelis (K), Calgary Stampeders
2007 - Dominique Dorsey (RB), Toronto Argonauts
2006 - Noel Prefontaine (P), Toronto Argonauts
2005 - Noel Prefontaine (P), Toronto Argonauts
2004 - Jason Armstead (WR), Ottawa Renegades
2003 - Wane McGarity (WR), Calgary Stampeders
2002 - Keith Stokes (WR), Montreal Alouettes

References 

Canadian Football League trophies and awards